Sorghum intrans, commonly known as Darwin canegrass, is a species of grass native to the Northern Territory and Western Australia.

References

intrans
Poales of Australia
Flora of the Northern Territory
Angiosperms of Western Australia
Plants described in 1878